The Joys was a steamboat that sank in Lake Michigan off the coast of Sturgeon Bay, Wisconsin, United States. In 2007 the shipwreck site was added to the National Register of Historic Places.

History
The Joys was built in Milwaukee, Wisconsin in 1884. She would go on to haul cargo through the Sturgeon Bay Ship Canal from Menominee, Michigan to the ports of Milwaukee, Chicago, Illinois, Manistee, Michigan and Michigan City, Indiana.

On December 23, 1898, the Joys was at anchor in the Sturgeon Bay Ship Canal. At about 1:00 a.m., the captain saw flames from the wheelhouse and sounded the alarm. The crew was able to escape, but in the ensuing chaos the ship was carried in the current toward the canal office and government warehouse. Eventually, efforts from those on land were successful in towing the vessel away from land, where it then burned to the waterline and sank.

References

1884 ships
Ships built in Milwaukee
Maritime incidents in 1898
Ships sunk with no fatalities
Shipwrecks of Lake Michigan
Shipwrecks of the Wisconsin coast
Shipwrecks on the National Register of Historic Places in Wisconsin
National Register of Historic Places in Door County, Wisconsin
Steam barges